Surprise is a compilation album released in 2001 by South Korean girl group S.E.S. under SM Entertainment. It has sold approximately 350,000 copies. The record is composed of Korean versions of the group's Japanese songs. The only single was "꿈을 모아서 (Just In Love)" (originally "Yume wo Kasanete"). A bonus track, "Fate World" (a Korean version of "Meguriau Sekai"), is included.

Track listing
 사랑이라는 이름의 용기 (In the Name of Love)
 Unh... Happy Day
 꿈을 모아서 (Just In Love)
 LIKE A SHOOTING STAR
 W/O/U (Eugene's Solo)
 A Song for You (Bada's Solo)
 Little Bird
 Believe in Love
 Love Is Day by Day
 Searchin' for My Love
 Sweety Humming (Shoo's Solo)
 달 끝까지 (Beyond the Moon)
 운명적인 세상 (Fate World) (Hidden Track)

Music program awards

External links 
  S.E.S.' Official Site
  SM Entertainment's Official Site

S.E.S. (group) albums
2001 compilation albums
SM Entertainment compilation albums